The Greg Voelker Rack System is a unique drum rack used by former Megadeth drummer Nick Menza, David Beal drummer for Joe Cocker, Julian Lennon, Honeymoon Suite, Rod Morgenstein drummer for Dixie Dregs and Winger and was voted by Modern Drummer Magazine's "Most Popular Progressive Rock Drummer", Michael Foster, drummer for FireHouse, and Whitesnake drummer Tommy Aldridge. It was designed for its lack of stands, which serves for a flashy live look and prevents a drummer/band from knocking over cymbal/drum stands. Designed by Greg Voelker, the rack was made out of Stainless Steel and was attached to a built in riser which allows the bass drums to float. Thereby, giving the drummer more mounting flexibility as well as avoiding the clutter of stands on stage. The racks mentioned were custom made for each drummer. A "Standard" rack by Greg Voelker was distributed through Premier drums from the late 1980s to the early to mid-1990s.

Former Megadeth drummer, Shawn Drover, had a similar set up, influenced by the original "Voelker Rack System" used by Nick Menza. Greg Voelker also created a one of a kind cowbell as a gift to Mickey Hart, which he chose to use on the Grateful Dead's recording of "Touch Of Grey". Other clients include: Randy Castillo, Ozzy Osbourne, Mötley Crüe, Jimmy Clark – drummer for Debbie Harry, Billy Cobham, drummer for Mahavishnu Orchestra, Bobby and the Midnites Deen Castronovo of Bad English and Journey, Audie Desbrow of Great White, Joe Franco, Myron Grombacher drummer for Pat Benatar, Mickey Hart of Grateful Dead and Mickey Hart Band, Jeff Rich of Status Quo, John Tempesta of Testament, Alex Van Halen, and Victor Wilson, aka Beatmaster V of Body Count.

External links 
Greg Voelker Interview – NAMM Oral History Library (2016)

Drumming